The Symphony No. 6, From a New Zealand Diary, Op. 65, is an orchestral composition by the Finnish composer Aulis Sallinen, who wrote the piece from 1989–90. The New Zealand Symphony Orchestra, the commissioning institution, premiered the work on 6 September 1990 in Napier, under the baton of Sallinen's longtime advocate, Okko Kamu. Sallinen and his wife had vacationed in New Zealand the year prior, providing the composer with inspiration for the symphony, which—though properly symphonic in scope and in structure—has been described as involving "tone painting"; indeed, each of the four movements contains a descriptive title, unusual for a Sallinen symphony.

Instrumentation 
According to the publisher, Novello & Co, Symphony No. 6 is scored for the following:
Woodwind: 3 flutes (2 doubling piccolo), 3 oboes (1 doubling cor anglais), 3 clarinets in B (1 doubling E clarinet, 1 doubling B bass clarinet), 3 bassoons (1 doubling contrabassoon)
Brass: 4 horns in F, 3 trumpets in B, 3 trombones, 1 tuba
Percussion: timpani, percussionists (individual instruments?)
Strings: violins, violas, cellos, double basses, harp, celesta

Structure 
The symphony is in four movements:

Recordings 
To date, Symphony No. 6 has received two recordings, the first of which is from 1992 with Okko Kamu conducting the Malmö Symphony Orchestra on the  BIS label. Finnish conductor Ari Rasilainen has also recorded the symphony as part of cpo's compendium of Sallinen's orchestral works. The Sixth Symphony joins the Cello Concerto (Op. 44, 1977) on the final volume of the cpo series.

Notes, references, and sources

Notes

References

Sources 

Books

Journal articles
 
 

Symphonies by Aulis Sallinen
1990 compositions
Sallinen 6